The third season of Phineas and Ferb  first aired on Disney Channel on March 4, 2011, and on Disney XD on March 7, 2011. The season features two step-brothers on summer vacation trying to make every day the best day ever, while their sister tries to bust them. The five main characters are: brothers Phineas Flynn and Ferb Fletcher, the brothers' older sister Candace Flynn,  secret agent Perry the Platypus (who's also the pet of Phineas and Ferb) and the evil scientist Dr. Heinz Doofenshmirtz. Midway through this season, the TV movie Across the Second Dimension had aired on August 5, 2011.

Recurring characters are across-the-street neighbor Isabella Garcia-Shapiro, the boys' mother and father Linda Flynn-Fletcher and Lawrence Fletcher, Major Monogram, Carl the Intern, Jeremy Johnson, Baljeet Tjinder, Buford Van Stomm, Stacy Hirano, and more.

Production
The season was announced by Dan Povenmire and Jeff "Swampy" Marsh on June 9, 2009, and was confirmed two days later.

Episodes

Ratings
All of the episodes have had positive reviews. The most viewed episode was "My Fair Goalie" with 4.7 million viewers, and the least watched episode was "Excaliferb" with 2.2 million viewers.

DVD releases

Notes

References

General references

See also

External links 

2011 American television seasons
2012 American television seasons
 

de:Liste der Episoden von Phineas und Ferb#Staffel 3
cz:Seznam epizod seriálu Phineas a Ferb#Série 3: 2011 - 2012
ko:피니와 퍼브의 에피소드 목록#시즌 3 (2011–12)
fr:Liste des épisodes de Phinéas et Ferb#Troisième saison (2011-2012)
hu:A Phineas és Ferb epizódjainak listája#3.évad
pl:Lista odcinków serialu animowanego Fineasz i Ferb#Seria 3: 2011–2012
pt:Anexo:Lista de episódios de Phineas e Ferb#3ª Temporada: 2011-2012
ro:Lista episoadelor din Phineas și Ferb#sezonul 3: 2011-2012